Júlio César da Cruz Coimbra known as Júlio César (born 10 October 1980) is a Brazilian footballer.

Biography
On 1 July 2005 he left for Brazilian third division club América (SP). He joined another Série C club Sertãozinho in June 2007. In May 2008 he was signed by América (RN) and transferred to Botafogo (SP) in August, for 2008 Copa Paulista. His contract was extended in December. After played for Botafogo in 2009 Campeonato Paulista, he left for Criciúma. He played 7 out of 8 games in the third division.

In December 2009, he left for Guaratinguetá in 1-year deal. He played 6 games in 2010 Campeonato Brasileiro Série B. He seriously injured Willian in round 5 and later suspended for 6 months. In December 2010 he was offered a new 1-year contract, where he played the first four months with namesake Júlio César de Paula Muniz Júnior. He played 14 matches in the 2011 Campeonato Paulista, which he did not play the last 4 matches (round 16 to 19) and round 12 due to his third caution.

On 13 May 2011 he left for Fortaleza. After only one appearance in the third division, he was released in October.

References

External links
 

Brazilian footballers
Mirassol Futebol Clube players
América Futebol Clube (SP) players
Clube Atlético Sorocaba players
Sertãozinho Futebol Clube players
América Futebol Clube (RN) players
Botafogo Futebol Clube (SP) players
Criciúma Esporte Clube players
Guaratinguetá Futebol players
Fortaleza Esporte Clube players
Association football central defenders
People from São Gonçalo, Rio de Janeiro
1980 births
Living people
Sportspeople from Rio de Janeiro (state)